This is a list of flags inscribed with Latin-language text.

See also
List of inscribed flags

Notes

Latin language
Flags